Jamasi is a town in the Ashanti Region of Ghana.

 Districts of Ghana     Sekyere South

Constituency : Afigya Sekyere East

Population : 8,000

Occupation : Farming, best cocoa seedlings production.

Ethnic group        Akans

Languages of Ghana     Twi, English

The town is known for the Adu Gyamfi Secondary School.  The school is a second cycle institution.

References

Populated places in the Ashanti Region